Kamëntsá, also referred to as Camsá (Kamsá, Kamse), Mocoa, Sibundoy, Coche, or Kamemtxa / Camëntsëá, is a language isolate and native language of the Camsá people who primarily inhabit the Sibundoy Valley of the Putumayo Department in the south of Colombia.

Language contact
Jolkesky (2016) notes that there are lexical similarities with the Choco languages due to contact.

Varieties
Mason (1950) lists the following names as Coche (Mocoa) varieties.

Sebondoy
Quillacinga
Patoco

Phonology

Vowels 
O'Brien (2018) analyzes six vowel phonemes in Camsá: /a e i o u ɨ/. O'Brien notes that /ɨ/ has a limited distribution and is rarely found at the beginnings of words, and that [i] in many cases may be an allophone of /e/ before palatal consonants.

Grammar

Camsá is a polysynthetic language with prefixes and suffixes. It also has dual number, which is unusual for languages around it.

Vocabulary
Kamsá vocabulary from Huber and Reed (1992):

{| class="wikitable sortable" style="font-size: 85%"
! no. !! English gloss !! Spanish gloss !! Kamsá !! notes
|-
| 001 || tongue || lengua || biᶘtá-xa || 
|-
| 002 || mouth || boca || wajá-ɕa || 
|-
| 003 || lip || labio || wajatsebiá-ɕa || 
|-
| 004 || tooth || diente || xuatsá-ɕe || 
|-
| 005 || nose || nariz || tsxá-ɕe || 
|-
| 006 || eye || ojo || bɕnɨ-bé || 
|-
| 007 || ear || oreja || matskuá-ɕe || 
|-
| 008 || head || cabeza || bestɕá-ɕe, betɕá-ɕe || 
|-
| 009 || forehead || frente || xuentsɨɕá-ɕe || 
|-
| 010 || hair || cabello || stxɨnɨ́-xa || 
|-
| 011 || chin || mentón || kumbambɨ́-ɕa || 
|-
| 012 || beard || barba || wangɨtsboboʃɨ́-xua || 
|-
| 013 || neck || cuello || tamoɕá-xa || 
|-
| 014 || chest || pecho || kotʃá-xa || 
|-
| 015 || woman’s breast || teta, seno, pechos || tʃótʃo || 
|-
| 016 || abdomen || vientre, abdomen || wabsbiá || 
|-
| 017 || back || espalda || stɨtɕá-xa || 
|-
| 018 || shoulder || hombro || tantɕá-xa || 
|-
| 019 || arm || brazo || buakuá-tɕe || 
|-
| 021 || elbow || codo || ʃɨmia-bé || 
|-
| 022 || hand || mano || kukuá-tɕe || 
|-
| 023 || finger || dedo de la mano || ntɕabuá-bxa || 
|-
| 024 || fingernail || una || ngétsebia-ɕe || 
|-
| 025 || leg || pierna || mɨntxá-xa || 
|-
| 027 || knee || rodilla || ntsamiá-ɕe || 
|-
| 028 || shin || espinilla || ɕɨbxá-xa || 
|-
| 029 || foot || pie || ʃekuá-tɕe || 
|-
| 030 || toe || dedo del pie || xɨntɕá-bxa || 
|-
| 031 || skin || piel || bobátʃe || 
|-
| 032 || bone || hueso || betá-ɕe, betá-bxa || 
|-
| 033 || blood || sangre || buíɲe || 
|-
| 034 || heart || corazón || ainána || 
|-
| 035 || lungs || pulmones || béxnatse || 
|-
| 036 || penis || pene || lótɕe || 
|-
| 037 || vulva || vulva || salápo || 
|-
| 038 || man || hombre || entɕá (jentɕá) || 
|-
| 039 || male || varón || bojabása || 
|-
| 040 || woman || mujer || ʃembása || 
|-
| 041 || people || gente || entɕánga || 
|-
| 042 || husband || marido, esposo || bojá || 
|-
| 043 || wife || marida, esposa || ʃéma || 
|-
| 044 || father || padre || taitá, bébta || 
|-
| 045 || mother || madre || mamá, bebmá, máma || 
|-
| 046 || baby, infant || criatura || ɕeɕóna, (ɕoɕóna) || 
|-
| 047 || old man || viejo || bɨtsanań || 
|-
| 048 || water || agua || bújeʃe, béxa-je || 
|-
| 049 || river || río || béxa-ke, bʃáxa-je || 
|-
| 051 || lake || lago || wabxaxóna-je || 
|-
| 052 || swamp || pantano || xatɨʃáɲe || 
|-
| 053 || spring of water || fuente, ojo de agua || obaxtʃkaníɲe || 
|-
| 054 || waterfall || caída de agua || buatʃkɨkxaníɲe || 
|-
| 055 || rapids || catarata, raudal || bʃawenaníɲe || 
|-
| 056 || flame, fire || candela, fuego || íɲe, níɲe || 
|-
| 057 || ash || ceniza || xatinjá || 
|-
| 058 || charcoal || carbón || enaxomá-ɕe || 
|-
| 059 || smoke || humo || ngóna || 
|-
| 060 || firewood || leña || niɲá || 
|-
| 061 || sky || cíelo || sel-óka || Spanish loanword
|-
| 062 || rain || lluvia || wabténa || 
|-
| 063 || wind || viento || bínjia || 
|-
| 064 || sun || sol || ʃínje || 
|-
| 065 || moon || luna || xuaʃkóna || 
|-
| 066 || star || estrella || estrelja-téma || Spanish loanword
|-
| 067 || day || día || bɨnɨ-té, té || 
|-
| 068 || night || noche || ibéta || 
|-
| 069 || thunder || trueno || waxuesajá || 
|-
| 070 || lightning || relámpago || tkuínje || 
|-
| 071 || rainbow || arco iris || tsɨbkuákuatxo || 
|-
| 072 || earth, soil || tierra || bʃántse || 
|-
| 073 || stone || piedra || ndɨtɕ-bé || 
|-
| 074 || sand || arena || kaskáxo || Spanish loanword
|-
| 075 || house || casa || jébna || 
|-
| 076 || roof || techo || thɨxnaɲe, bonxanána || 
|-
| 077 || door || puerta || bɨɕá-ɕe || 
|-
| 078 || seat, stool || banco || tɕenɨ́-ɕe || 
|-
| 079 || mat || estera || txuá-ʃe || 
|-
| 080 || hammock || hamaca || uxonjanɨ́-ʃa || 
|-
| 081 || bed || catre, cama de barbacoa || xutsnɨ́-ʃa || 
|-
| 082 || cooking pot || olla || matbá-xa || 
|-
| 083 || cultivated clearing || roza, sementera || xaxáɲe || 
|-
| 084 || village || caserío || pueblo-téma || Spanish loanword
|-
| 085 || path, trail || camino, sendero, trocha || benátʃe || 
|-
| 086 || fish net || red || ataʒajɨ́-ʃa || Spanish loanword
|-
| 087 || fish hook || anzuelo || ansuelɨ-bxuá || Spanish loanword
|-
| 088 || axe || hacha || tatɕnía || Spanish loanword
|-
| 089 || knife || cuchillo || kutʃiljɨ-bxa || Spanish loanword
|-
| 090 || canoe || canoa || kanoú-ɕe || 
|-
| 091 || paddle || remo || ʒem-bé || Spanish loanword
|-
| 092 || club || porra, macana || ngarot-bé || Spanish loanword
|-
| 093 || spear || lanza || lantsɨ́-ʃa || Spanish loanword
|-
| 094 || bow || arco de cazar || arkú-bxa || Spanish loanword
|-
| 095 || arrow || flecha || pletʃɨ-bxuá || Spanish loanword
|-
| 096 || blowgun || cerbatana || . xuesanɨ-ɕa || 
|-
| 097 || tapir || danta || bɨtsijá || 
|-
| 098 || jaguar || tigre || tígre || Spanish loanword
|-
| 099 || puma || león, puma || león || Spanish loanword
|-
| 100 || armadillo || armadillo || armadiljo-bé || 
|-
| 101 || dog || perro || kéɕe || 
|-
| 102 || deer || venado || biángana, móngoxo || 
|-
| 103 || bat || murciélago || tʃimbiláko || 
|-
| 104 || otter || nutria || salado-bé || 
|-
| 105 || cebus monkey (Cebus capucinus) || capuchin, machín || komendéro || Spanish loanword
|-
| 110 || spotted cavy || paca, guagua || mɨmaɕe || 
|-
| 113 || tortoise || tortuga || tortúga-ɕe || Spanish loanword
|-
| 115 || collared peccary || saíno || saín kótɕe || Spanish loanword
|-
| 117 || agouti || agutí || entsóje-ɕe || 
|-
| 118 || rat || rata || ʒáta-tɕe || Spanish loanword
|-
| 119 || cat || gato || meséto || 
|-
| 120 || mouse || ratón || ʃiéna || 
|-
| 121 || tail || cola || waskuatɕi-xuá || 
|-
| 122 || snake || serpiente, culebra || mɨtɕkuáje || 
|-
| 123 || anaconda, water boa || mapana || amarón || 
|-
| 126 || toad || sapo || sápo || Spanish loanword
|-
| 127 || bird || pájaro || ʃlóbtɕe || 
|-
| 128 || hummingbird || picaflor, colibrí || ngɨntsiána || 
|-
| 130 || toucan || tucán || pikúdo || 
|-
| 131 || parrot || loro || ʃatúo, ʃatú || 
|-
| 133 || buzzard || gallinazo || ngaljináso || Spanish loanword
|-
| 134 || curassow || pavo || tʃúmbo || 
|-
| 135 || owl || lechuza, buho || koskúngo || 
|-
| 136 || guan || pava de monte || kukuána || 
|-
| 137 || hen || gallina || tuámba || 
|-
| 138 || fish || pescado || beóna || 
|-
| 140 || bee || abeja || txowána || 
|-
| 141 || fly || mosca || ʃatsɨbiána || 
|-
| 142 || flea || pulga || nzantsána || 
|-
| 143 || louse || piojo || mɨtsána || 
|-
| 144 || mosquito || zancudo || ʃɨngna-bxa || 
|-
| 146 || ant || hormiga || xuána || 
|-
| 147 || spider || arana || báxna, batʃná-ɕe || 
|-
| 148 || jigger flea || nigua, pigue || tsɨtxóna || 
|-
| 149 || bush, jungle || monte || txá-ɲe || 
|-
| 150 || open grassland || pajonal, sabana || xatʃáɲe || 
|-
| 151 || hill || cerro, loma || batsxáɲe || 
|-
| 152 || tree || árbol || betíje, betijé-ʃe || 
|-
| 153 || leaf || hoja || tsbuaná-tʃe || 
|-
| 154 || tree leaf || hoja de árbol || tsbuaná-tʃe || 
|-
| 155 || flower || flor || wantɕebxú-ʃa || 
|-
| 156 || fruit || fruta || ʃaxuan-bé || 
|-
| 158 || root || raíz || tbɨtɨ́-xa || 
|-
| 159 || seed || semilla || xénaje || 
|-
| 160 || stick || palo || niɲɨ́-ɕe || 
|-
| 161 || grass || hierba || ʃákuana || 
|-
| 162 || corn, maize || maíz || mátse || 
|-
| 163 || manioc || yuca || bʃendɨ́-ɕe || 
|-
| 165 || tobacco || tabaco || tbáko || Spanish loanword
|-
| 166 || cotton || algodón || tongéntse-ʃe || 
|-
| 167 || gourd || calabazo poro || taus-bé || 
|-
| 168 || yam || ñame || tʃaná || 
|-
| 169 || sweet potato || camote || mijá || 
|-
| 170 || achiote || achiote, bija || mandorɨ́-ʃa || 
|-
| 171 || chili pepper || ají || tsɨtɕá || 
|-
| 173 || Banisterium, hallucinogenic vine || ayahuasca, jajé || biaxíje || 
|-
| 174 || plantain || plátano || blandɨ́-tɕa || Spanish loanword
|-
| 178 || cane || caña brava || ɕɨ́-ɕe || 
|-
| 179 || salt || sal || tamó || 
|-
| 180 || chicha || chicha, masato || bóko-ye || 
|-
| 181 || one || uno || kánje || 
|-
| 182 || two || dos || úta || 
|-
| 183 || three || tres || únga || 
|-
| 184 || four || cuatro || kánta || 
|-
| 185 || five || cinco || ʃátʃna || 
|-
| 190 || ten || diez || bnɨ́tsan || 
|-
| 191 || first || primero || natsána || 
|-
| 192 || last || último || ústonoje || 
|-
| 193 || rattle || sonajero, maraca || marakɨ́-ʃe || Spanish loanword
|-
| 194 || drum || tambor || ɕɨnxana-bé || 
|-
| 195 || cushma || cushma || ʃabuanguanɨ-xuá || 
|-
| 196 || ear ornament || orejera, arete || wamatsaxonjanɨ́-ʃa || 
|-
| 197 || mask || máscara || xobɨ́tsanɨ-ɕe || 
|-
| 198 || healer, shaman || curandero || tatɕmbuá, jobá || 
|-
| 199 || chief || cacique, curaca, capitán || utabná, mandádo || Spanish loanword
|-
| 200 || I, me, my || yo, mí usted || átɕe || 
|-
| 201 || you (singular) || usted || áka || 
|-
| 202 || he || él || tʃá || 
|-
| 203 || she || ella || tʃá || 
|-
| 204 || we inclusive || nosotros inclusivo || bɨ́nga || 
|-
| 206 || you plural || ustedes || tɕingabtánga || 
|-
| 207 || they || ellos || tʃɨ́nga || 
|-
| 208 || my hand || mi mano || átɕ-be kukuá-tɕe || 
|-
| 209 || your (sg.) hand || tu mano || ák-be kukuá-tɕe || 
|-
| 210 || his hand || su mano || tʃá-be kukuá-tɕe || 
|-
| 211 || our hands || nuestras manos || bɨng-be kukuá-tɕe || 
|-
| 213 || their hands || sus manos (de ellos) || tʃɨ́ng-be kukuátɕe || 
|-
| 214 || my bow || mi arco || átɕ-be arkú-bxa || Spanish loanword
|-
| 215 || your bow || tu arco || ák-be arkú-bxa || 
|-
| 216 || his bow || su arco (de él) || tsá-be arkú-bxa || 
|-
| 217 || our bow || nuestro arco || bɨ́ng-be arkú-bxa || 
|-
| 219 || their bow || su arco (de ellos) || tʃɨ́ng-be arkú-bxa || 
|-
| 220 || big || grande || bɨ́ts || 
|-
| 221 || small, little || pequeño || báse, bíntʃe || 
|-
| 222 || cold || frío || ʃék-bana || 
|-
| 223 || hot || caliente || ntɕníɲe || 
|-
| 224 || good || bueno || tɕábe, tɕabá || 
|-
| 225 || bad || malo || baká, bákna sóje || 
|-
| 226 || white || blanco || bxántse || 
|-
| 227 || black || negro || btsénga || 
|-
| 228 || go! || vaya, ve! || m-ó-tsa || 
|-
| 229 || come! || ven! || m-á-bo || 
|-
| 230 || eat! || come! || m-ó-se || 
|-
| 231 || drink! || bebe! || m-o-bɕé || 
|-
| 232 || sleep! || duerme! || m-o-tsámana || 
|-
| 233 || crown of head || corona || tʃinʃ-óka || 
|-
| 234 || front teeth, incisors || dientes delanteros incisivos || btɨɕá-ɕe || 
|-
| 236 || long hair || pelo largo || bɨ́n stxɨná-ʃe || 
|-
| 237 || the neck region || garganta y cuello || bexɨ́ngua-xa || 
|-
| 238 || Adam’s apple || nuez de la garganta || tamoɕtxon-bé || 
|-
| 239 || upper back || espalda, parte superior || stɨtɕá-xa || 
|-
| 241 || wrist || muñeca || ʃɨmia-bé || 
|-
| 242 || lower leg || pierna inferior || ɕɨbxá-tɕe || 
|-
| 243 || body hair || el pelo del cuerpo || bobo-ʃɨ́-xa || 
|-
| 244 || stomach || estómago || wabsbiá || 
|-
| 245 || intestines || intestinos || tʃuntʃuljɨ-xua-ngá || 
|-
| 246 || old woman || viejita || wela-xéma || 
|-
| 247 || clouds at rest || nubes quietas || xantɕetɨ́-ʃe || 
|-
| 249 || cultivated clearing || roza, sementera de maíz || taɕxá-ɲe || 
|-
| 250 || stream || quebrada || báse béxa-je || 
|-
| 251 || pebbles || piedrecillas || ndɨtɕmé-ʃe || 
|-
| 252 || huge rocks || rocas grandes || peɲí-ɕe || Spanish loanword
|-
| 253 || path, trail || camino, sendero, trocha || axʃatʃnɨxní-ɲe || 
|-
| 255 || shelter || rancho || tambo-téma || 
|-
| 256 || this || este || kém || 
|-
| 257 || that || eso, ese, aquel || tʃɨ́ || 
|-
| 258 || who || quién || ndá, ndmuá || 
|-
| 259 || what || que || ndajá || 
|-
| 260 || not || no || ndóɲe || 
|-
| 261 || all || todos || njćtska || 
|-
| 262 || many || muchos || bɨtská, bá, bá-nga || 
|-
| 263 || long || largo || bɨ́n || 
|-
| 264 || bark || corteza || xubobá-ʃe || 
|-
| 265 || flesh || carne || mɨntɕéna || 
|-
| 267 || grease, animal fat || grasa || minjiká || Spanish loanword
|-
| 268 || egg || huevo || ʃɨmnɨ-bé || 
|-
| 269 || horn || cuerno || tsɨtxoní-ɕe || 
|-
| 270 || feather || pluma || plumɨ-bxuá || Spanish loanword
|-
| 271 || elaw, nail || uña, garra || ngétsebia-ɕe || 
|-
| 272 || belly || barriga || wabsbiá || 
|-
| 273 || liver || hígado || bekotʃká || 
|-
| 274 || drink || beber || xatmuána, xobɕiána || 
|-
| 275 || eat || comer || xasána || 
|-
| 276 || bite || morder || xaxantsána || 
|-
| 277 || see || ver || xinjána || 
|-
| 278 || hear || oir || xowenána || 
|-
| 279 || know || saber || xtsetatɕmbuána || 
|-
| 280 || sleep || dormir || xómanana || 
|-
| 281 || die || morir || xóbanana || 
|-
| 282 || kill || matar || xóbana || 
|-
| 283 || swim (not bathe) || nadar || xatʃbabána || 
|-
| 284 || fly || volar || xongébxuana || 
|-
| 285 || walk || andar || xtsanána || 
|-
| 286 || come || venir || xabána || 
|-
| 287 || lie down || acostarse || xtsexáxonana || 
|-
| 288 || sit down || sentarse || xotbemána || 
|-
| 289 || stand || ponerse en pie, de pie || xotsajána || 
|-
| 290 || give || dar || xatɕetajána || 
|-
| 291 || say || decir || xajanána || 
|-
| 292 || burn || quemar, arder || xtsejiɲána || 
|-
| 293 || mountain || montaña || xáɲe || 
|-
| 294 || red || rojo || buángana || 
|-
| 295 || green || verde || ngɨ́bʃna || 
|-
| 296 || yellow || amarillo || tsɨɕijána || 
|-
| 297 || full || lleno || xútxena || 
|-
| 298 || new || nuevo || tsɨ́m || 
|-
| 299 || round || redondo || -bé || 
|-
| 300 || dry || seco || boxóxo, buaʃána || 
|-
| 301 || name || nombre || wabáina || 
|-
| 302 || how || cómo || ntɕámo || 
|-
| 303 || when || cuándo || ntséko, ntséko ora || 
|-
| 304 || where || donde || ndm-óka, ndaj-éntɕe || 
|-
| 305 || here || aquí || mu-éntɕe || 
|-
| 306 || there || allí || tʃ-éntɕe || 
|-
| 307 || other || otro || ínje, injá || 
|-
| 308 || few || poco || batɕá, básebta || 
|-
| 309 || fog || neblina || xantɕetɨ́-ʃe || 
|-
| 310 || flow || fluir || xtsobuána || 
|-
| 311 || sea || mar || már béxa-je || 
|-
| 312 || wet || mojado || btʃékuana || 
|-
| 313 || wash || lavar || xáxabiana || 
|-
| 314 || worm || gusano || tsɨkɨmiána || 
|-
| 315 || wing || ala || xuatɨngmiá-ʃa || 
|-
| 316 || fur || piel peluda || bobo-ʃá, bobó-ʃe || 
|-
| 317 || navel || ombligo || wamɨʃtɨtɨ́-ɕa || 
|-
| 318 || saliva || saliva || jebuá-je || 
|-
| 319 || milk || leche || létɕi-je || Spanish loanword
|-
| 320 || with || con || -ka, -btaka || 
|-
| 321 || in || en || -óka, -íɲe, -éntɕe || 
|-
| 322 || at || en, lugar definido || -óka || 
|-
| 323 || if || si || -se, -sna || 
|-
| 324 || ice || hielo || jélo || Spanish loanword
|-
| 326 || freeze || helarse || xtseʃekbána || 
|-
| 327 || child || niño || báse-tema || 
|-
| 328 || dark || oscuro || ibéta || 
|-
| 329 || cut || cortar || kutʃú-j || 
|-
| 330 || wide || ancho || tɨntɕá || 
|-
| 331 || narrow || estrecho, angosto || báse tɨntɕá || 
|-
| 332 || far || lejos || bɨn-óka || 
|-
| 333 || near || cerca || béko-ɲe || 
|-
| 334 || thick || grueso || xoʃá || 
|-
| 335 || thin || delgado || báse xoʃá || 
|-
| 336 || short || corto || béko || 
|-
| 337 || heavy || pesado || teʃut-, úta || 
|-
| 338 || dull || embotado || ndɨ-ngmɨtʃɨ́-bxa || 
|-
| 339 || sharp || afilado || bɕá-xa, ngmitʃɨ́-bxa || 
|-
| 340 || dirty || sucio || tsénga, tsengá || 
|-
| 341 || rotten || podrido || xanguána || 
|-
| 342 || smooth || liso || bɨngɨnjána || 
|-
| 343 || straight || recto || nderítʃe || 
|-
| 344 || correct || correcto || tɕabá || 
|-
| 345 || left || izquierdo || waɲikuaj-ói-ka || 
|-
| 346 || right || derecho || katʃbi-ói-ka || 
|-
| 347 || old || viejo || tángua || 
|-
| 348 || rub || frotar || xanɨtxuána || 
|-
| 349 || pull || jalar, arrastrar || xuasxanána || 
|-
| 350 || push || empujar || xatsɨntɕána || 
|-
| 351 || throw || botar, tirar || xutɕenána || 
|-
| 352 || hit || golpear || xuénanana || 
|-
| 353 || split || hender || xaʃtɨtɕána || 
|-
| 354 || pierce || punzar, chuzar || xangɨsɨtxuána || 
|-
| 355 || dig || cavar || xaxutxuána || 
|-
| 356 || tie || atar || xabátsikana || 
|-
| 357 || sew || coser || xuaxonajána || 
|-
| 358 || fall || caer || xotsatɕána || 
|-
| 359 || swell || hinchar || xabʃatʃána || 
|-
| 360 || think || pensar || xenóxuabojana || 
|-
| 361 || sing || cantar || xabérsiana || Spanish loanword
|-
| 362 || smell || oler || xongɨtsetɕiána || 
|-
| 363 || vomit || vomitar || xáʃkonana || 
|-
| 364 || suck || chupar || xobkuakuajána || 
|-
| 365 || blow || soplar || xangowána || 
|-
| 366 || fear || temer || xtsawatxána || 
|-
| 367 || tighten, squeeze || apretar, exprimir || xatɨbána || 
|-
| 368 || hold || sostener || xotbajána || 
|-
| 369 || down || abajo || tsɨtx-óka || 
|-
| 370 || up || arriba || tsbanán-oka || 
|-
| 371 || ripe || maduro || bótʃena || 
|-
| 372 || dust || polvo || polbɨ́-ʃe || Spanish loanword
|-
| 373 || alive || vivo || ainá || 
|-
| 374 || rope || cuerda || biá-xa || 
|-
| 375 || year || año || wáta || 
|}

Notes

Bibliography

 
 
 
 
 
  (alk. paper) (Contains mythic and legendary in Camsá with interlinear morphemic glossing and English translations.)
 

Language isolates of South America
Languages of Colombia